Edward Creasy may refer to:
 Edward Shepherd Creasy, English historian and jurist
 Edward Crozier Creasy, British Army officer